Kuzehrash (also Romanized as Kūzehrash and Kūzeh Rash) is a village in Shenetal Rural District of Kuhsar District of Salmas County, West Azerbaijan province, Iran. At the 2006 National Census, its population was 1,458 in 222 households. The following census in 2011 counted 1,377 people in 288 households. The latest census in 2016 showed a population of 1,501 people in 334 households; it was the largest village in its rural district.

References 

Salmas County

Populated places in West Azerbaijan Province

Populated places in Salmas County